The 1969 Marshall Thundering Herd football team was an American football team that represented Marshall University as an Independent during the 1969 NCAA University Division football season. In its first season under head coach Rick Tolley, the team compiled a 3–7 record and was outscored by a total of 281 to 207. The team played its home games at Fairfield Stadium in Huntington, West Virginia.

Prior to the season, Marshall was suspended indefinitely from the Mid-American Conference due to committing a number of recruiting violations.

Schedule

References

Marshall
Marshall Thundering Herd football seasons
Marshall Thundering Herd football